Ernesto Giobando S.J. (13 December 1959) is an Argentine prelate of the Roman Catholic Church. He has been an auxiliary bishop of Buenos Aires since 2014.

Life 
Born in Santa Fe, Argentina, Giobando was ordained to the priesthood on 17 November 1990.

On 5 March 2014 he was appointed auxiliary bishop of Buenos Aires and titular bishop of Appiaria. Giobando received his episcopal consecration on 3 May from Mario Aurelio Poli, archbishop of Buenos Aires, with bishop of Lomas de Zamora, Jorge Rubén Lugones, bishop of Azul, Hugo Manuel Salaberry Goyeneche, bishop of Jujuy, César Daniel Fernández, and auxiliary bishop emeritus of Buenos Aires, Horacio Ernesto Benites Astoul, serving as co-consecrators.

See also
Catholic Church in Argentina

References

External links 
 Bishop Ernesto Giobando, S.J. on Catholic-Hierarchy.org 

1959 births
Living people
21st-century Roman Catholic bishops in Argentina
Roman Catholic bishops of Buenos Aires